The abaya is an arabic dress.

Abaya may also refer to:

Abaya (surname)
Lake Abaya, a lake in Ethiopia
Abaya (woreda), a woreda in Ethiopia
Abala Abaya a woreda in Wolayita Zone of Ethiopia